Alexandru Antoniuc (born 23 May 1989) is a Moldovan footballer who plays as a midfielder for Milsami Orhei and the Moldova national team.

Club career
He made his professional debut on 13 July 2007 against Politehnica Chișinău and scored his first goal against Olimpia Bălţi on 16 March 2008 to finish a 7–0 rout.

He signed a four-year contract with reigning Russian Premier League champions Rubin Kazan on 23 June 2010.

International career
In the final match of 2014 FIFA World Cup qualifying, Moldova took on Montenegro in Podgorica. Both teams had nothing to play for as England and Ukraine had already taken first and second place. Antoniuc scored twice in a 5–2 away win, Moldova's joint biggest competitive away win.

Career statistics

Club

International
Scores and results list Moldova's goal tally first.

Honours
Milsami Orhei
Moldovan National Division: 2014–15
Moldovan Cup: 2017–18
Moldovan Super Cup: 2019

References

External links

 
 

1989 births
Living people
Footballers from Chișinău
Moldovan footballers
Moldovan expatriate footballers
Moldova youth international footballers
Moldova under-21 international footballers
Moldova international footballers
FC Zimbru Chișinău players
FC Rubin Kazan players
Russian Premier League players
Moldovan Super Liga players
Expatriate footballers in Russia
Moldovan expatriate sportspeople in Russia
FC KAMAZ Naberezhnye Chelny players
FC Veris Chișinău players
FC Milsami Orhei players
Association football forwards
Russian First League players